The Mahārāṣṭra Vidhāna Sabhā  or the Maharashtra Legislative Assembly is the lower house of the legislature of the Indian state of Maharashtra. It is situated in the Nariman Point area of South Mumbai in the capital Mumbai. Presently, 288 members of the Legislative Assembly are directly elected from the single-seat constituencies. The members of the upper house, the Maharashtra Vidhan Parishad (the legislative council) are indirectly elected through an electoral college.

Maharashtra Legislature Leaders

Party Group Leader & Chief Whip

Sessions
The budget session and the monsoon session are convened in Mumbai whereas the winter session is convened in the auxiliary capital Nagpur. In 1975 because elections were in winter season, the monsoon (second) session was convened in Nagpur and winter (third) session was convened in Mumbai.

14th Legislative Assembly 

The Members of 14th Maharashtra Assembly of Maharashtra were elected in the 2019 Maharashtra Legislative Assembly election, with results announced on 21 October 2019.

Membership by party

List of previous Assemblies

The following is the list of all the Maharashtra Legislative Assemblies (1961-Present):

See also

 Bombay Legislative Assembly
 Legislature of Maharashtra
 Elections in Maharashtra
 List of constituencies of Maharashtra Legislative Assembly
 Maharashtra Vidhan Parishad
 List of governors of Maharashtra
 List of Chief Ministers of Maharashtra
 List of speakers of the Maharashtra Legislative Assembly
 List of Deputy Speakers of the Maharashtra Legislative Assembly
 List of Leaders of the House of the Maharashtra Legislative Assembly
 List of Deputy Leader of the House of the Maharashtra Legislative Assembly
 List of Leader of the Opposition of the Maharashtra Legislative Assembly

References

External links 
   Maharashtra Lok Sabha Elections Website
 

State lower houses in India
Maharashtra Legislature